Lina Morgenstern (25 November 1830 – 16 December 1909) was a German writer, educator, feminist and pacifist.

Biography
She was born 25 November 1830 in Wrocław (German Breslau) to a Jewish family committed to social causes. In 1854 she married Theodor Morgenstern (1827–1910), and they moved to Berlin. The couple had five children – three daughters (Clara, Olga, and Martha) and two sons (Michael and Alfred).

Morgenstern first started writing articles about education and children's care in order to contribute to the family's income, when her husband had financial problems. In 1859, the same year that her third child, Olga, was born, she and Adolf Lette founded the Berliner Frauen-Verein zur Beförderung der Fröbel’schen Kindergärten (Berlin women's association for the advancement of Fröbelian kindergartens), which advocated for the establishment in Berlin of kindergartens, a form of preschool education conceived of by the pedagogue Friedrich Fröbel. Morgenstern served as chair from 1862 to 1866, by which time the society had established eight kindergartens in the city, as well as a school for the education of kindergarten teachers.

In 1866, during the Austro-Prussian War, she founded Berlin's first Volksküche ('public kitchen,' or soup kitchen), an organization that offered nutritional meals at very low prices (reflecting at most the cost of preparation), based on a philosophy of helping needy people without putting them in the position of accepting outright charity.

In 1896, she organised the Internationaler Kongress für Frauenwerke und Frauenbestrebungen in Berlin and she entered in the directive committee of the German Peace Society (DFG) in 1897.

She died 16 December 1909, in Berlin.

Works
Das Bienenkätchen (Breslau, 1859)
Das Paradies der Kindheit durch Spiel, Gesang und Beschäftigung (Leipzig, 1861)
Ernährungslehre (1880)
Die Frauen des 19. Jahrhunderts (1888–91)
Der häusliche Beruf (1890)
Illustriertes  Universal-Kochbuch für Gesunde und Kranke (Berlin, 1905)

References

External links
 
  www.kindergartenpaedagogik.de
  jwa.org/encyclopedia
 Lina Morgenstern papers (digitized), in RG 31 Germany (Vilna Archives) Collection, at the YIVO Institute for Jewish Research
 Illustriertes Kochbuch Digitized cookbook by Lina Morgenstern at the Leo Baeck Institute, New York 

1830 births
1909 deaths
Writers from Wrocław
People from the Province of Silesia
19th-century German Jews
German Peace Society members
German educational theorists
German feminists
Jewish women writers
19th-century German women writers